Baraghan Rural District is in Chendar District of Savojbolagh County, Alborz province, Iran. At the census of 2006, its population was 1,424 in 518 households, and in the most recent census of 2016, it had increased to 3,949 in 1,484 households. The largest of its 16 villages is Baraghan, with 470 people.

References 

Savojbolagh County

Rural Districts of Alborz Province

Populated places in Alborz Province

Populated places in Savojbolagh County